Pseudomeliola is a genus of fungi in the Hypocreales order. The relationship of this taxon to other taxa within the order is unknown (incertae sedis), and it has not yet been placed with certainty into any family.

References

External links
Pseudomeliola at Index Fungorum

Sordariomycetes genera
Hypocreales incertae sedis